On March 10, 2021, Marcia Fudge resigned her seat in the United States House of Representatives after being confirmed by the United States Senate to serve as the Secretary of Housing and Urban Development in the Biden administration. Governor Mike DeWine set the primary date for August 3, concurrent with the special election in Ohio's 15th congressional district. The general election was on November 2. Shontel Brown won both the competitive Democratic primary and the general election, and was sworn in on November 4.

Democratic primary
By early January 2021, former state senator Nina Turner, Cuyahoga County Council member Shontel Brown, and former Cleveland City Council member Jeff Johnson had all announced their candidacies. Turner was perceived as the progressive candidate in the race, while Brown was considered a moderate. Johnson portrayed himself as ideologically between the other two.

Turner filed paperwork to register a committee by the name of "Nina for Us" with the Federal Election Commission (FEC) on the day the Fudge appointment was announced. On December 10, Fudge's nomination was made official; five days later, Turner announced her candidacy in the special election for Ohio's 11th congressional district.

By mid-February 2021, former state senator Shirley Smith and former state representative John E. Barnes Jr. had entered the primary. Turner and Brown were considered the front-runners at this point, with Turner having raised $650,000 to Brown's $40,000. Upon entering the race, Smith attacked Turner for her ties to left-wing activist groups and Brown for her ties to the Cuyahoga County "machine", while Barnes touted his legislative experience. On February 19, The Plain Dealer and Cleveland.com Editorial Team called on Brown to resign as Cuyahoga County Democratic Party chair in order to avoid conflicts of interest, and to "restart the process of amassing local endorsements from scratch" as a candidate and not a "powerful local chair".

By the time the United States Senate confirmed Fudge as HUD secretary, two more candidates had entered the race: Bryan Flannery, a former state representative, and Tariq Shabazz, who ran in the Democratic primary for OH-11 in 2020. The candidates in the Democratic primary have a noted geographical divide. The 11th district, which is heavily gerrymandered, is split roughly evenly between Cuyahoga and Summit Counties. However, six of the seven major candidates were from Cuyahoga County, Flannery being the only exception. Flannery withdrew from the race in early May, citing family issues.

By mid-June, Seth Richardson of The Plain Dealer considered Turner the sole front-runner, as expected support for Brown's campaign had not materialized. Turner was often called the "frontrunner" in local and national media. In late June, several senior and more moderate Democrats publicly announced their support for Brown; these endorsements were noted as resulting in large fundraising hauls for Turner, but they caused Brown to rise substantially in the polls, though her fundraising totals remained behind Turner's. In July, Brown was referred to the Ohio Ethics Commission over allegations made in an article in The Intercept that she had used her influence to award government contracts to campaign donors. Brown faked the endorsement of Garfield Heights Councilman Michael Dudley, who actually endorsed Turner.

In the days leading up to the special election, many national figures came to last-minute campaign events. Figures such as House Majority Whip Jim Clyburn campaigned for Brown, while figures such as Senator Bernie Sanders, a 2016 and 2020 contender for the Democratic nomination for president of the United States, campaigned for Turner.

David Weigel of The Washington Post said Brown's campaign was trying to make the special election "a referendum on supporting the Biden administration" but that Brown's lack of substance on what she would do in Congress "has become a sticking point in the primary". Due to the fragmented nature of the field, it was considered unlikely that any candidate would get 50% of the vote, which resulted in heavy campaigning in Summit County, home to Akron, as the traditionally overlooked pool of voters there were considered a potential swing factor.

Brown won the August 3 primary with 50.2% of the vote.

Campaign financing 

By mid-February 2021, Turner had raised $650,000 to Brown's $40,000. Final direct campaign donations in August totaled $2.1 million for Brown and $4.5 million for Turner, according to FEC filings. No other candidate raised more than $60,000.

By July, the Democratic Majority for Israel PAC had contributed over $660,000 in advertising attacking Turner and supporting Brown, a figure that rose to over $2 million by the end of the primary, $1 million of which was for television advertisements. The Jewish Democratic Council of America spent five figures targeting Jewish voters in support of Brown. As of late July, the Working Families Party pledged to spend at least $150,000 for Turner via its Super PAC. By the end of the campaign, outside advertisement spending supporting Turner or opposing Brown totaled $900,000 and outside advertisement spending supporting Brown or opposing Turner totaled $2.9 million. NPR reported that the Turner team's fundraising was approximately $5.7 million, while Brown's campaign was about $2.6 million.

Analysis 

Exit polls showed that Brown won some of the areas with a higher proportion of Black and Jewish voters while Turner won some with more white voters, a minority in the district. In general, Brown fared better in wealthier areas, while Turner won more with below-average incomes. Brown won more areas in the suburbs, while Turner won more in the city of Cleveland. A press release from the Brown campaign says that their internal polling also showed that Turner's loss could be attributed in part to her comparison of voting for then-candidate Joe Biden to "eating half a bowl of shit".

According to HuffPost, Turner’s campaign spent too much on consultants rather than television advertising, and did not "adequately respond to the inevitable attacks on Turner’s history of conflict with key figures in the Democratic Party".

In the broader context of 2021 Democratic primaries, the race was one example of the success of the Democratic Party's institutional, moderate faction against its left-wing factions. In this race Brown represented the successful institutional faction, while Turner represented the leftist faction. Representative Hakeem Jeffries described this institutional success as a marker Democratic voters' disinterest in the more strident ideological rhetoric of the leftist faction. Moderate party leaders publicly exulted at this success. Biden advisors saw the moderate wins as proof of its success in 2020 and as proof of the importance of moderate voters. Members of the left disputed this characterization following the primary season, noting primary election successes like the mayoral campaigns in Buffalo and Pittsburgh and the success of progressive incumbents like Philadelphia district attorney Larry Krasner.

Candidates

Nominee
 Shontel Brown, Cuyahoga County Council member (2015–present), Chair of the Cuyahoga County Democratic Party

Eliminated in primary
 John E. Barnes Jr., former state representative for the 12th district (1999–2002, 2011–2018)
Jeff Johnson, former state senator for the 10th district (1990–1998), former Cleveland City Council member (1984–1990, 2014–2018), candidate for Mayor of Cleveland in 2017
 Tariq Shabazz, U.S. Navy veteran, candidate for OH-11 in 2020
 Shirley Smith, former state senator for the 21st district (2007–2014), former Assistant Minority Leader of the Ohio Senate (2008–2014), former state representative for the 8th district (1999–2003) and the 10th district (2003–2006)
 Nina Turner, president of Our Revolution (2017–present), former state senator for the 25th district (2008–2014), former Minority Whip of the Ohio Senate (2013–2015), former Cleveland City Councillor (2006–2008), national co-chair of the 2016 and 2020 Bernie Sanders presidential campaigns, nominee for Ohio Secretary of State in 2014

Other declared candidates
Martin Alexander, lawyer
James Jerome Bell, author and perennial candidate
Seth J. Corey, oncologist
Will Knight, businessman
Pamela Pinkney, preacher
Isaac Powell, former city council candidate
Lateek Shabazz, businessman and teacher
Reece Wright-McDonald, Reform Party candidate

Withdrawn
Bryan Flannery, former state representative for the 17th district (1999–2002) and candidate for governor of Ohio in 2006

Declined
Blaine Griffin, Cleveland City Council member for Ward 6 (endorsed Turner)
Stephanie Howse, state representative (endorsed Turner)
Sandra Williams, state senator (endorsed Turner)

Debates

Endorsements

Polling
Graphical summary

Results

Republican primary

Candidates

Nominee
 Laverne Gore, businesswoman, nominee for OH-11 in 2020

Eliminated in primary
 Felicia Washington Ross, Democratic candidate for Ohio's 12th state house district in 2020

Endorsements

Results

General election

Predictions

Endorsements

Results

Notes

Partisan clients

References

External links

Official campaign websites
 Shontel Brown (D) for Congress
 Laverne Gore (R) for Congress

Ohio 2021 11
Ohio 2021 11
2021 02 Special
Ohio 11 Special
United States House of Representatives 11 Special
United States House of Representatives 2021 11